Diane Murray is a former US Olympian, competing in taekwondo.  Murray earned a silver medal in the 1992 Olympic Games and a bronze medal at the 1993 World Taekwondo Championships in the bantamweight division. In 1992, at the age of 39, she was inducted into the Black Belt magazine Hall of Fame.

References

American female taekwondo practitioners
Olympic silver medalists for the United States in taekwondo
World Taekwondo Championships medalists
Medalists at the 1992 Summer Olympics
20th-century American women